Acerentomon is a genus of proturans in the family Acerentomidae.

Species

 Acerentomon aceris Rusek, 1965
 Acerentomon affine Bagnall, 1912
 Acerentomon album Loksa, 1966
 Acerentomon bagnalli Womersley, 1927
 Acerentomon balcanicum Ionesco, 1933
 Acerentomon baldense Torti, 1986
 Acerentomon brevisetosum Condé, 1945
 Acerentomon carpaticum Nosek, 1961
 Acerentomon condei Nosek & Dallai, 1982
 Acerentomon dispar Stach, 1954
 Acerentomon doderoi Silvestri, 1907
 Acerentomon dominiaki Szeptycki, 1977
 Acerentomon fageticola Rusek, 1966
 Acerentomon franzi Nosek, 1965
 Acerentomon gallicum Ionesco, 1933
 Acerentomon giganteum Condé, 1944
 Acerentomon granulatum Szeptycki, 1993
 Acerentomon hylophilum Rusek, 1966
 Acerentomon imadatei Nosek, 1967
 Acerentomon italicum Nosek, 1969
 Acerentomon kustorae Nosek, 1983
 Acerentomon maius Berlese, 1908
 Acerentomon meridionale Nosek, 1960
 Acerentomon mesorhinus Ionesco, 1930
 Acerentomon microrhinus Berlese, 1909
 Acerentomon nemorale Womersley, 1927
 Acerentomon noseki Torti, 1981
 Acerentomon novaki Rusek, 1965
 Acerentomon omissum Szeptycki, 1980
 Acerentomon oreophilon Szeptycki, 1980
 Acerentomon pannonicum Loksa, 1966
 Acerentomon parvum Szeptycki, 1980
 Acerentomon pseudomicrorhinus Nosek, 1977
 Acerentomon quercinum Ionesco, 1932
 Acerentomon robustum Ionesco, 1930
 Acerentomon rostratum Ionesco, 1951
 Acerentomon skuhravyi Rusek, 1965
 Acerentomon tenuisetosum Nosek, 1973
 Acerentomon tuxeni Nosek, 1961

References

Protura